Gombakan (also Romanized as Gombakān, Gombekān, and Gambakān; also known as Golmakān, and Komyān) is a village in Sarpaniran Rural District, in the Central District of Pasargad County, Fars Province, Iran. At the 2006 census, its population was 470, in 123 families.

References 

Populated places in Pasargad County